Vest is a daily newspaper from North Macedonia. The paper was established in 2000.

References

External links
 Official page

Newspapers published in North Macedonia
Macedonian-language newspapers
2000 establishments in the Republic of Macedonia
Newspapers established in 2000
Mass media in Skopje